Zack Conroy (born April 19, 1985, in Portsmouth, New Hampshire) is an American actor and finance executive.

Career

Acting 
Conroy portrayed James Spaulding on Guiding Light from April 2009 until the show's finale in September of that year. In 2010, Conroy received a nomination for  Outstanding Younger Actor for his portrayal of James at the 37th Daytime Emmy Awards.

In December 2009, Conroy was cast on The Bold and the Beautiful as Oliver Jones. His first air date was on January 20, 2010. On April 5, 2013, it was announced that Conroy would cross over to B&Bs sister-soap The Young and the Restless in his role as Oliver, starting on May 21. His final appearance was in 2015.

Finance 
Conroy graduated from Boston College with a bachelor's degree in finance and management. In June 2015, he earned a master's degree in business administration from UCLA.

Over the last several years, Conroy has served as a financial advisor to several entertainment-related companies. In 2020, he was appointed senior vice president of finance and operations at 2.0 Entertainment.

Filmography

Awards and nominations

References

External links

1985 births
American male soap opera actors
American male television actors
Living people
People from Portsmouth, New Hampshire